The European Journal of Comparative Economics is an open access double blind reviewed academic journal of the European Association for Comparative Economic Studies published by the University Carlo Cattaneo. The journal was established in 2004 and appears biannually. It is abstracted and indexed by EconLit and EBSCO databases.

External links 
 

Economics journals
English-language journals
Publications established in 2004
Biannual journals
Academic journals associated with international learned and professional societies of Europe
Academic journals published by universities and colleges
Open access journals